Lee Clark Mitchell (born 1947) is an American author and professor American studies and literature. He is the Holmes Professor of Belles-Lettres at Princeton University and the former chair of the English Department and director of the program in American studies.

Early life and education 
Mitchell was born in 1947. He completed his Ph.D. at University of Washington.

Personal life 
Mitchell was married to musicologist Carolyn Abbate with whom he has two sons. In April 2019, he announced his engagement to Cameron Platt after 7 months of dating. They met in the Fall of 2013 when Mitchell was a professor and later a mentor of Platt. They began a personal relationship in 2018 after Platt completed a master's degree at University of Oxford on a Rhodes Scholarship.

Selected works

Books

References

External links
 

Living people
1947 births
20th-century American male writers
21st-century American male writers
Princeton University faculty
University of Washington alumni